Kami District may refer too:

 Kami District, Miyagi
 Kami District, Kōchi